Loxocrepis is a genus of ground beetles in the family Carabidae. There are about seven described species in Loxocrepis.

Species
These seven species belong to the genus Loxocrepis:
 Loxocrepis cruralis (Chaudoir, 1879)  (India, Myanmar, Taiwan, Vietnam, and temperate Asia)
 Loxocrepis dentifera (Darlington, 1970)  (Indonesia)
 Loxocrepis obscuritarsis (Chaudoir, 1879)  (worldwide)
 Loxocrepis picea (Andrewes, 1927)  (Samoa and Vanuatu)
 Loxocrepis rubriola (Bates, 1883)  (Japan and temperate Asia)
 Loxocrepis ruficeps (W.S.MacLeay, 1825)  (India, Indonesia, Myanmar, Philippines, and Sri Lanka)
 Loxocrepis violacea (Chaudoir, 1859)  (Australia, Indonesia, New Guinea, and the Solomon Islands)

References

Platyninae